Music from the Adventures of Pete & Pete is a studio album by the band Polaris, a one-off project involving members of the late 1980s and early 1990s band Miracle Legion. It features twelve songs composed by the band between 1992 and 1995 for the cult Nickelodeon television series, The Adventures of Pete & Pete. The album remains the only full-length release by Polaris. A deluxe edition was released in September 2020 via Mezzotint Records on vinyl and CD, containing unreleased demos, a lyric sheet and other additional material.

The album is dedicated to "Astrochimp Ham & Spacedog Laika".

The final track on the album contains a hidden section that begins at 5:29. This hidden track is composed of a number of sound clips concerning the Apollo 11 mission.

The National covered "Ashamed of the Story I Told" on the benefit album Ciao My Shining Star: The Songs of Mark Mulcahy.

Track listing
All tracks written by Mark Mulcahy.
 "Hey Sandy" – 2:36
 "She Is Staggering" – 3:08
 "Waiting for October" – 3:52
 "Saturnine" – 3:13
 "Everywhere" – 3:37
 "Ivy Boy" – 3:51
 "Summerbaby" – 3:24
 "Coronado II" – 4:19
 "Ashamed of the Story I Told" – 4:29
 "As Usual" – 5:22
 "Recently" – 2:40
 "The Monster's Loose" – 9:01
The 2020 "21st Century Edition" contains:

Side A:

 Hey Sandy
 She is Staggering
 Waiting For October
 As Usual
 Everywhere
 Ivy Boy

Side B:

 Summerbaby
 Coronado II
 Ashamed Of The Story I Told
 Saturnine
 Recently
 The Monster's Loose

CD Tracklist:

 The Monsters Loose
 CORONADO II
 Holy Holly
 Waiting for October
 21st Century Space Walk
 Hey Sandy
 As Usual
 Ashamed of the Story I told
 Recently
 Waiting for October electric guitar
 Saturnine instrumental
 As Usual w/drums
 Waiting for October acoustic instrumental
 Coronado II instrumental
 Look at the Rocket Go!

Personnel

Polaris
Muggy - vocals and guitar
Jersey - bass
Harris Polaris - drums

Additional performers
Tom Chase - organ and piano
Buel Thomas - trumpet
Dennis Kelly - pedal steel guitar
Joyce Raskin - vocals on "Ashamed of the Story I Told"

References

1999 albums
Record Store Day releases